The Economy of Ethnic Cleansing: The Transformation of the German-Czech Borderlands after World War II (2017) is a book by David Gerlach about the expulsion of Germans from Czechoslovakia and colonization efforts in the Sudetenland, the German-majority area.

References

2017 non-fiction books
Sudetenland
History books about ethnic cleansing
History books about the Czech Republic
21st-century history books
Ethnic cleansing of Germans
Cambridge University Press books